The Siegesdenkmal ("victory monument") in Freiburg im Breisgau is a monument to the German victory in the Franco-Prussian War in 1871. It was erected at the northern edge of the historic center of Freiburg im Breisgau next to the former Karlskaserne (barracks). After World War II it was moved 100m to the west. Today it is located on Europaplatz.

History 

The Siegesdenkmal is dedicated to the XIV Corps (German Empire) of the German army, in which mostly soldiers from Baden served. Under the command of General August von Werder the battles at Montbéliard in 1871 ended in victory. In the general mood of victory, funds were raised in Baden (with cities from Lörrach to Karlsruhe participating), to erect a statue in the middle of Baden.

A public competition was organized among the sculptors in Germany for a design of the statue. Whereby, some artists were explicitly invited to participate. The jury consisted of five artists and art connoisseurs:
 
 Ernst Julius Hähnel from Dresden 
 Wilhelm Lübke from Stuttgart 
 Eduard Magnus from Berlin 
 Friedrich Pecht a court painter from Munich
 Gottfried Semper from Vienna

The winner amongst the 18 competitors is Karl Friedrich Moest, a sculptor working at the art academy of Karlsruhe. He was then also in charge of the realization of the monument. Professor Caspar von Zumbusch from Munich and Reinhold Begas from Berlin earned second and third places respectively. Their models were displayed in the city's Augustiner Museum. Joint second place went to the sculptor Josef Alois Knittel from Freiburg im Breisgau, whose son Gustav Adolf Knittel later on became the master student of Moest and was involved in the construction of the Siegesdenkmal.

The sculptural and ornamental elements were made in the Bildgießerei ("casting house") of Lenz in Nürnberg and the work on the granite was conducted by local sculptor Alberto Luratti. For the decoration of the monument gun barrels from the defeated enemy were used. The total production cost amounted to 85,000 gold marks.

The monument was inaugurated on October, 3rd, 1876. At the inauguration Emperor Wilhelm I, Grand Duke Frederick I and his wife Louise, Imperial Chancellor Otto von Bismarck and August von Werder  himself, among others, resided as guests of honor.

When the government was collecting metal in 1940, Robert Heinrich Wagner, the Gauleiter (district leader) on the Upper Rhine (Baden and Alsace), requested the monument to be given to Adolf Hitler as a birthday present. This request was denied by the city administration. In 1944, November, 4th, the monument survived a bombing even though the barracks of the Karlsbau, which are situated directly next to the monument, were entirely destroyed. The west wing of the building was rebuilt between 1950 and 1951. Nowadays, it houses the city's social welfare and youth welfare office.

In 1948, the request by the German Peace Society and Bund der Kriegsgegner (German Pacifist Union) to remove the monument was denied.  In 1961, the monument was moved 100 m westwards as it had become an obstacle on the newly built city highway. There, the monument to the Baden Dragoons used to be situated, but this was removed after the war. At the old location of the Siegesdenkmal, a big crossroads was built, with tram and bus stations and a pedestrian underpass. In the course of the construction work on the Rotteckring, which started in 2014 and are anticipated to last to 2018, it is planned to move the monument back to its original place.

Design 
The memorial has a square base which is surrounded by steps on all four sides. It is made of granite from the Black Forest. The statue of the goddess of victory stands on the tapered pedestal.  She is on a hemisphere and holding a laurel wreath. Four warriors armed with different types of weapons rise from the corners of the base. Three of them are intended to symbolize the defenders, but the fourth warrior, an artillerist, is fatally injured. The figures are considered the main work of Karl Friedrich Moest.

The pedestal shows four bronze tablets with inscriptions. Its corners are embellished with juvenile genii in positions of movement.

Above them, medallions with the emblems of the German Reich are engraved.

Reception

Notes

References 
 Conradi, Ingrid: Glanz und Gloria – oder Geschmacklosigkeit? In: Michael Klant (Hg.): Skulptur in Freiburg, Band 2 – Kunst des 19. Jahrhunderts im öffentlichen Raum. Freiburg 2000, modo verlag.  
 Kempf, Friedrich: Öffentliche Brunnen und Denkmäler. In: Badischer Architecten- und Ingenieur-Verein, Oberrheinischer Bezirk (publ.): Freiburg im Breisgau. Die Stadt und ihre Bauten. H. M. Poppen & Sohn, Freiburg im Breisgau 1898, pp. 492–494  
 Schadek, Hans (Hg.): Freiburg ehemals, gestern, heute. Die Stadt im Wandel der letzten 100 Jahre. Steinkopf Verlag, 2004. ;   
 Scherb, Ute: "Wir bekommen die Denkmäler, die wir verdienen". Freiburger Monumente im 19. und 20. Jahrhundert, Freiburg 2005

External links 

 Das Denkmal 1890 und heute
 Freiburger Zeitung vom Tag der Enthüllung

Buildings and structures completed in 1871
Buildings and structures in Freiburg im Breisgau
Monuments and memorials in Germany
History of Freiburg im Breisgau
Granite sculptures
Sculptures of women in Germany
Sculptures of goddesses
Sculptures of men in Germany
Outdoor sculptures in Germany
Bronze sculptures in Germany